Carola Daniel Amri Kinasha is a Tanzanian musician. She is proudly "Tanzanian and forever Maasai" and is a pioneer of traditional fusion in Tanzania. An accomplished performer, Kinasha is also an activist fighting for the basic rights of musicians in her country. She has worked extensively on campaigns to bring music education back into the schools of Tanzania. In 2000, Kinasha was recognised by the MA Africa Awards in South Africa. Her music crosses cultural boundaries, from Tanzania to the Congo, a unique blend of the traditional with the present.

Early life and career 
Carola Kinasha was born into a family of eight children, in Longido village, close to the Kenyan border. Kinasha's father played the accordion, her brothers played the piano, organ and guitar, and her mother still sings in the village choir. While away at school or travelling, Kinasha's older siblings would bring home music from other areas. Her late brother Esto brought home country music, gospel and calypso; Abedi brought soul and classical, Oculi brought Tanzanian and Congolese music while her sister Juddy brought home South African music. At the same time, Kinasha would attend every traditional ceremony within walking distance of her home, where she could hear Maasai warriors and girls singing and dancing.

Kinasha is now recognized as one of the pioneers of traditional fusion music in Tanzania. "We need to be innovative and devise means to come up with our own Tanzanian musical identity", said Kinasha. "We cannot rely on aping while we have a treasure of traditional sounds that can be a source of a strong Tanzanian musical identity."

Kinasha's band Shada began in the late 1980s with the aim of creating an authentic Tanzanian sound. Kinasha also sang in 1987 for sTanzanian musician Watafiti under the name of a cooperation project Umoja, which been recorded on the disc. Maono, meaning visions or revelation in Swahili, is their second album. The music crosses cultural boundaries, from Tanzania to the Congo.

Professional involvements 
Throughout her career as international performer, Kinasha has guided and mentored young talents and acted as an educator on stage. She is a Project Manager in Music Mayday.

Activist 
Kinasha is also an activist fighting for the basic rights of musicians in her country. She graduated from the University of Dar es Salaam with a Bachelor of Arts Degree in International Relations, implementing her activism through music since 1988.  She has worked extensively on campaigns to bring music education back into the schools of Tanzania. In 2002 Kinasha was recognised by the MA Africa Awards in South Africa. Her music crosses cultural boundaries, from Tanzania to the Congo, a unique blend of the traditional with the present.

Discography

Albums

Filmography

References 

1972 births
Living people
Tanzanian musicians
 Swahili-language singers